Patrick Michael Boutette (born March 1, 1952) is a Canadian former professional ice hockey centre. He played in the National Hockey League with the Toronto Maple Leafs, Hartford Whalers, and Pittsburgh Penguins between 1975 and 1985. Internationally he played for the Canadian national team at the 1981 World Championships.

Playing career
Born in Windsor, Ontario, Boutette began playing hockey at the University of Minnesota-Duluth from 1970-1973. He would play with the Toronto Maple Leafs, Hartford Whalers, and Pittsburgh Penguins. Boutette retired from the National Hockey League following 752 games, recording 171 goals and 282 assists for 453 points as well as 1354 penalty minutes.

Career statistics

Regular season and playoffs

International

Awards and honors

References

External links
 

1952 births
Living people
AHCA Division I men's ice hockey All-Americans
Binghamton Whalers players
Canadian expatriate ice hockey players in the United States
Canadian ice hockey centres
Franco-Ontarian people
Hartford Whalers players
Ice hockey people from Ontario
London Knights players
Minnesota Duluth Bulldogs men's ice hockey players
Oklahoma City Blazers (1965–1977) players
Pittsburgh Penguins players
Sportspeople from Windsor, Ontario
Toronto Maple Leafs draft picks
Toronto Maple Leafs players